Kadia or Kadiya may refer to:

 Kadia (term), a term to refer to a mason in Indi

a

Communities in India
Kadia (Muslim), a Muslim community found in the states of Gujarat and Maharashtra
Gurjar Kshatriya Kadia, a Hindu community in Gujarat and Maharashtra
Kadia Kumbhar, a Hindu sub-group of the Kumbhar caste
Sathwara or Kadia Sathwara, a Hindu caste in Gujarat
Kutchi Kadia, a Hindu community in Gujarat

Places
Kadia (Ahmedabad), Gujarat, India
Kadia, Ghana

See also
Kadia (given name), a European-language feminine name
Kadija (disambiguation)
John Kadiya